Kolbeinsey (also known as Kolbeinn's Isle, Seagull Rock, Mevenklint, Mevenklip, or Meeuw Steen) is a small islet in the Greenland Sea located  off the northern coast of Iceland,  north-northwest of the island of Grímsey. It is the northernmost point of Iceland and lies north of the Arctic Circle. The islet is named after Kolbeinn Sigmundsson, from Kolbeinsdalur in Skagafjörður, who according to Svarfdæla saga is said to have broken his ship there and died with his men. A basalt landform and devoid of vegetation, Kolbeinsey is subject to rapid wave erosion and is expected to disappear in the near future. Erosion rate data from 1994 suggested that this would happen around 2020. , two small skerries remained visible at low tide.

History 
The original size of Kolbeinsey is unknown. By 1903, it had already diminished to half of that size.

Iceland would eventually declare a  exclusive economic zone (EEZ) in 1975. A helipad was constructed  in 1989 and further efforts to reinforce the island were discussed in the Icelandic parliament in the 1990s. However, an agreement was reached in 1997 between Iceland, Denmark and Greenland (which was a party to the agreement in its own capacity) that permanently fixed the EEZ boundary in the area, giving Iceland control over 30 percent of the disputed area, while Greenland would control the remaining 70 percent. Since that agreement, Kolbeinsey has not been relevant to the definition of EEZ boundaries and there were no further efforts to reinforce the island.

In March 2006, it was reported that helicopters were no longer able to land on Kolbeinsey. It had been found that almost a half of the helipad that was laid with concrete in 1989 had been destroyed when a large piece of rock separated from the rest of the island.

In August 2020, English YouTuber Tom Scott published a video in which he chartered a plane to confirm the continued existence of Kolbeinsey; two islands were still visible. In April 2021, the Icelandic Coast Guard visited the island and measured it as 20 meters wide from west to east and 14.5 meters long from north to south.

Geology 
A submarine eruption was reported in 1999 near the Kolbeinsey Ridge northwest of Grímsey. Kolbeinsey is the only subaerial expression of this portion of the Mid-Atlantic Ridge. It formed during the late-Pleistocene or Holocene. Dredged glass shards indicate submarine eruptive activity during the late-Pleistocene until at least 11,800 radiocarbon years ago.

See also 
 Extreme points of Iceland
 Geography of Iceland
 List of islands off Iceland
 List of volcanoes in Iceland
 Volcanism of Iceland
 Geology of Iceland

References

External links 
 Further information on Kolbeinsey
 Kolbeinsey að hverfa in Icelandic

Volcanoes of Iceland
Uninhabited islands of Iceland
Mid-Atlantic Ridge
Territorial disputes of Iceland
Islands of Iceland